Pereute is a Neotropical genus of butterflies in the family Pieridae.

Species
Pereute antodyca (Boisduval, 1836)
Pereute callinice (Felder, C & R Felder, 1861)
Pereute callinira Staudinger, 1884
Pereute charops (Boisduval, 1836)
Pereute cheops Staudinger, 1884
Pereute leucodrosime (Kollar, 1850)
Pereute lindemannae Reissinger, 1970
Pereute swainsoni (Gray, 1832)
Pereute telthusa (Hewitson, 1860)

References

Pierini
Pieridae of South America
Pieridae genera
Taxa named by Gottlieb August Wilhelm Herrich-Schäffer